St. Thomas' Episcopal Church (St. Thomas' Guild Hall ; St. Thomas' Rectory) is a parish in the Episcopal Diocese of Ohio. Its historic Gothic Revival style church, at 214 E. Second Street in Port Clinton, Ohio, was built in 1896. It was added to the National Register of Historic Places in 1999.

References

External links
 www.episcopalportclinton.org

Episcopal churches in Ohio
Churches on the National Register of Historic Places in Ohio
Gothic Revival church buildings in Ohio
Churches completed in 1896
Buildings and structures in Ottawa County, Ohio
National Register of Historic Places in Ottawa County, Ohio
19th-century Episcopal church buildings
1896 establishments in Ohio